Celtis caucasica, the Caucasian hackberry or Caucasian nettle tree, is a species of flowering plant in the family Cannabaceae. It is native to the Caucasus region, Central Asia, and on to the western Himalaya. Hardy to USDA zone 5b, it tolerates poor soils, drought, and nearby paving, and can be used as street tree. It is a nitrogen-fixer, in symbiosis with the mycorrhizal fungi Funneliformis mosseae and Rhizophagus intraradices.

References

caucasica
Flora of Turkey
Flora of the Caucasus
Flora of Iraq
Flora of Iran
Flora of Central Asia
Flora of Afghanistan
Flora of Pakistan
Flora of West Himalaya
Plants described in 1806